Śmiechowice may refer to:

Śmiechowice, Opole Voivodeship, Poland
Śmiechowice, Świętokrzyskie Voivodeship, Poland